Victorian-era cosmetics refers to cosmetic products used during the Victorian age. Victorian cosmetics were often toxic or otherwise damaging. Commonly used products included ingredients such as lead, mercury, arsenic, and ammonia.

Many cosmetic products were aimed at achieving as pale a complexion as possible, as this would indicate a woman did not have to work outside, and was thus of high status. The two main styles were "natural", which conveyed that a woman was of good morals, and "painted", which was seen as somewhat provocative.

Skin

The use of excessive makeup in the Victorian age was viewed as promiscuous and would only be seen on performers or prostitutes. A pure, natural face, free from blemishes, freckles, or marks was considered beautiful. However, that didn't mean women did not secretly concoct their own remedies and cosmetics to enhance features and hide imperfections. Societal women did not want it known that they wore cosmetics so their beauty rituals were not publicized or discussed. One of the most important features to a woman in the Victorian Era was to have the most translucent, pale complexion possible. A fair and healthy complexion distinguished a woman's social status. A lady of a higher social standing would use accessories like gloves and umbrellas to help protect her from the environment. Cold cream - consisting of water, oil, emulsifier, and thickening agent - became a staple in the beauty rituals of Victorian women. It was believed that cold cream is beneficial for cleansing the skin and providing a moisturizing effect, and so the cream was essential to Victorian women who wanted to maintain very soft, delicate skin. It was one of the only products in the Victorian era that was fairly safe to use and not looked down upon. The invention of cold cream goes back to antiquity.

Women who employed the "painted" look used white paints and enamels on their faces and arms. This would mean avoiding exaggerated facial expressions, because the substances would crack. These substances were also corrosive to the skin because they contained lead, mercury, and arsenic so women would have to keep applying them to cover the damage.

Cheeks and lips 
Rouge was used to help add color to cheeks and lips. While women were discouraged from wearing makeup, women found ways to improve their complexion with rouge. Natural ingredients, such as strawberries or herbs, were seen as providing a suitable colour, and thus preferred. Lip rouge was made from multiple ingredients such as animal fat, beet root, herbs, beetles and almonds, to produce a pink or red hue.

Eyes

Watery eyes were considered attractive because (paired with pale skin) they were associated with tuberculosis. To achieve this, women put drops of perfume, citrus, or belladonna in their eyes - the latter an ingredient which would cause blindness if used for long enough. Mercury was used to make eyebrows and eyelashes less sparse.

Hair

High society Victorian woman went for natural beauty in regards to cosmetics to appear pure and youthful however there was a need for hair treatments and products that sustained intricate hairstyles. For many cultures woman's hair is an expression of their femininity, and Victorian women were of no exception. Many nineteenth-century photographs show women with extremely long hair. The length of the hair, in particular, was a display of a women's health and was well taken care of. Both men and women used products to promote hair growth. Since the use of cosmetics on societal women was limited, hair was kept well groomed. Victorian women would braid their hair, use hair wigs and apply heat to make tight curls. The Victorian era was a period in which it was more possible for women to focus on personal hygiene than it was in previous generations.

Perfume 
Natural scents were considered to be appropriate, while more overwhelming smells were associated with promiscuity. Queen Victoria considered floral scents to be the most appropriate for women to wear. Perfumes used included different types of floral such as lavender, violets, rose, and other citrus scents - the most popular apparently being violets - as well as infused herbs such as rosemary to help enhance the scents. Perfume was typically used on clothing, hair and handkerchiefs as opposed to on the skin.

References

History of cosmetics
Cosmetics